Voltinia may refer to:
 Voltinia (butterfly), a genus of metalmark butterflies
 one of the Servian tribes of ancient Rome.